Dating in the Dark premièred on the ABC television network on 20 July 2009. The show's format is based on a Dutch dating show called  (meaning "Dating in the Dark").

Format

Dating
Three men and three women are sequestered in separate wings of the house, unable to have any conversation or contact with the opposite sex unless in the dark room. Initially, all six contestants have a group date in which they all sit at a table in the dark room exchanging names and getting to know one another's voices and personality types. After this date, each contestant can invite another contestant for a one-on-one date; these dates are also held in the dark room.

Throughout the show, the host, Rossi Morreale, provides the men and women with additional insights by providing personality profiles showing which contestants are their best matches and also allowing them to view items the others have brought to the house, such as items of clothing or luggage. Other episodes include sketch artists drawing contestants' impressions of each other.

After the one-on-one dates, each contestant can choose to invite another that they wish to see. The contestants enter the dark room for the final time and are revealed to each other one at a time. During the reveal process the couple must remain silent.

The Reveal Process
While being shown in the light, a contestant cannot see the other contestant's reaction.  Each contestant is standing at opposite ends of the dark room with a very large two-way mirror between them. A color camera films from the dark side of the mirror while the other is illuminated on the other side. A separate infrared camera films the person on the dark side's reaction; the two images are combined in post-production.  This is done, in part, by using video editing software to fade the infrared image of the person being revealed to black before they are illuminated, then seamlessly showing the color image of the person being revealed as it is faded in and out.  During the reveal process the couple must remain silent.

The Balcony
The show culminates with each contestant choosing whether to meet another on the balcony of the house. The contestant will go to the balcony and wait for his or her prospective partner to join him or her. Joining the other on the balcony signifies that the contestants both want to pursue a relationship; exiting the house through the front door signifies that they do not want to pursue a relationship. Cameras are set up to show both the meeting balcony and the front door.

Episodes

Season 1 (2009)
Episode 1 (20 July 2009)

Episode 2 (27 July 2009)

Episode 3 (3 August 2009)

Chris was chosen by all three girls for the final date and the reveal.
Chris was chosen by all three girls to meet on the balcony, however, none of them did meet him.
The other guys are Philip(27) and Billy Ray(33).

Episode 4 (10 August 2009)

Episode 5 (17 August 2009)

Episode 6 (24 August 2009)

Season 2 (2010)
Episode 1 (9 August 2010)

Joey (31) didn't get chosen for a final date or reveal.
Both Jessica and Natasha wanted Dave, so they waited on the patio and in the piano room respectively. 
Episode 2 (16 August 2010)

 Joshua and Summer didn't get pictures, while Michael and Becky got two pictures.
 Joshua (28) didn't participate in the reveal or the waiting.
Episode 3 (23 August 2010)

Episode 4 (30 August 2010)

John (29) didn't participate in the reveal or the waiting.
Both Jill and Kate wanted Brad, so they waited on the patio and in the piano room respectively. Kate left before Brad made a decision.
Episode 5 (6 September 2010)

Episode 6 (13 September 2010)

For the first time, twin brothers (Ray and Shawn)(26) participate on the show at the same time but they were not chosen for a final date or reveal.
Harrison was chosen by all three girls for a final date and by Kahleel and Kayla for the final reveal.
Suzanne (24) decided to not date anyone so she did not wait on the patio.
Kayla and Kahleel both choose to wait for Harrison on the patio and in the piano room respectively.

Ratings

Season 1 (2009)

Season 2 (2010)

References

External links
 Official US version website
2000s American game shows
2010s American game shows
2000s American reality television series
2010s American reality television series
2009 American television series debuts
2010 American television series endings
American Broadcasting Company original programming